ŠK Prameň Kováčová is a Slovak football team, based in the town of Kováčová.

Current squad
As of 30 September 2020

Colours
Club colours are yellow and blue.

External links
profile at kovacova.sk 
Ligy.sk profile 
  
at Futbalnet.sk 
Club profile at Soccerway

References

Football clubs in Slovakia